Anders Wilhelm Andersson (2 November 1875 – 6 March 1945) was a Swedish sport shooter who competed in the 1920 Summer Olympics. In 1920 he won the silver medal as member of the Swedish team in the team free pistol competition. In the individual free pistol event he finished sixth.

References

External links
profile

1875 births
1945 deaths
Swedish male sport shooters
ISSF pistol shooters
Olympic shooters of Sweden
Shooters at the 1920 Summer Olympics
Olympic silver medalists for Sweden
Olympic medalists in shooting
Medalists at the 1920 Summer Olympics
People from Eskilstuna
Sportspeople from Södermanland County
19th-century Swedish people
20th-century Swedish people